In computer graphics, snapping allows an object to be easily positioned in alignment with grid lines, guide lines or another object, by causing it to automatically jump to an exact position when the user drags it to the proximity of the desired location.

Some CAD software provides a "Snap" pull-down menu with diverse options as preferences for the practice of the operation.

In Windows, with the option snap enabled, vertical positioning of a window against the top edge of the screen causes it to change into full screen.

Computer graphics